Thomas Bayley Hughes (1916-1988) was a Welsh, Anglican priest.

Hughes was educated at  the University of Wales  and St Michael's College, Llandaff. He was ordained deacon in 1941 and priest in 1942. After curacies at Llanrug and Llanberis he held incumbencies in Llangwnnadl, Llanllechid and Llangefni. He was Archdeacon of Bangor from 1983 to 1986.

References

1916 births
Archdeacons of Bangor
20th-century Welsh Anglican priests
Alumni of the University of Wales
1988 deaths